Live 2019 is a live album by French singer Mylène Farmer, released on 18 October 2019. It was recorded during her concert residency in Paris in June 2019. Live 2019 Le Film was released on DVD and Blu-ray on 6 December 2019.

Track listing

Charts

Weekly charts

Year-end charts

Certifications

}

Release history

References

External links

2019 live albums
2019 video albums
Mylène Farmer live albums